Académico de Viseu Futebol Clube is a Portuguese professional football club based in Viseu. Founded in 1914 as Clube Académico de Futebol, the club went through several changes over the course of the years, folding in 2005 due to financial troubles and re-founding under its current name. The club plays in the Liga Portugal 2, holding home games at Estádio do Fontelo, with a capacity of around 9,000.

History
In 2005, Clube Académico de Futebol, an historic founded officially in 1914 which competed in four top division seasons in the 1980s (the last being 1988–89), folded due to financial problems. In September 2005, Clube Académico de Futebol and G.D. Farminhão signed a protocol which made the latter change its name to "Académico de Viseu Futebol Clube", its headquarters to Viseu, its stadium to Estádio do Fontelo and its logo and colours to be the same as the extinct Clube Académico de Futebol, thus preserving the former and historic Clube Académico de Futebol.

Académico de Viseu Futebol Clube started competing again immediately in the Viseu first regional league, achieving promotion to the fourth tier Terceira Divisão in their second season in 2007.

In the last match of the 2008–09 season, after a 2–0 win against Anadia FC, the team was promoted to the third division, a feat which was accomplished on goal difference. They would, however, be immediately relegated back.

In the 2012/2013 season the team achieved promotion to the Segunda Liga and achieved a solid 11th place in the following season. In 2014/2015, they remained in this division.

Players

Current squad

Out on loan

Managerial history

  Luís Almeida (11 Jan 2009 – 25 Oct 2009)
  António Borges (1 Nov 2009 – 2 May 2010)
  João Paulo Correia (12 Sept 2010 – 24 Oct 2010)
  Paulo Gomes (31 Oct 2010 – 20 Feb 2011)
  Manuel Matias (27 Feb 2011 – 29 May 2011)
  António Lima Pereira (2011–2012)
  Carlos Agostinho (June 2012 – 11 Nov 2012)
  Filipe Moreira (25 Nov 2012 – 28 Dec 2013)
  Ricardo Chéu (2 Jan 2014 – 10 May 2014)
  Alex Costa (20 May 2014 – 12 Nov 2014)
  Ricardo Chéu (13 Nov 2014 – 7 Feb 2016)
  Bruno Ribeiro (15 Feb 2016 – 9 March 2016)
  Jorge Casquilha (20 March 2016 – 14 May 2016)
  André David (31 May 2016 – 29 November 2016)
  Francisco Chaló (29 November 2016 – February 2018)
  Manuel Cajuda (February 2018 – January 2019)
  Floris Schaap (January 2019 – February 2019)
  João Gabriel Ribeiro / Rui Borges (February 2019 – June 2019)
  Rui Borges (June 2019 – present)

Honours
Terceira Divisão: 1
2011–12
AF Viseu Liga de Honra: 11
1947–48, 1950–51, 1951–52, 1952–53, 1956–57, 1957–58, 1958–59, 1960–61, 1963–64, 1964–65, 2006–07

Source:

League and cup history

References

External links
 Académico de Viseu  
 Académico de Viseu at ZeroZero 

 
Football clubs in Portugal
Association football clubs established in 1914
1914 establishments in Portugal
Liga Portugal 2 clubs